Pavlovskaya is a rural locality (a village) in Nizhneslobodskoye Rural Settlement, Vozhegodsky District, Vologda Oblast, Russia. The population was 4 as of 2002.

Geography 
The distance to Vozhega is 50 km, to Derevenka is 5.5 km. Olyushinskaya, Yeskinskaya, Guryevskaya are the nearest rural localities.

References 

Rural localities in Vozhegodsky District